Tim Berne's Fractured Fairy Tales is an album by saxophonist Tim Berne which was recorded in 1989 and released on the JMT label.

Reception
The AllMusic review by Scott Yanow said "Tim Berne's music on his CD sometimes looks a little toward Anthony Braxton's free bop lines but also incorporates some electronics, unusual instrumental textures and some just plain weird sounds" and called it an "esoteric yet listenable set".

Track listing
All compositions by Tim Berne except as indicated
 "Now Then" (Tim Berne, Mark Dresser) - 3:13  
 "SEP" - 8:05  
 "Hong Kong Sad Song / More Coffee" - 11:36  
 "Evolution of a Pearl" - 19:34  
 "Lightnin' Bug Bouté" - 0:38  
 "The Telex Blues" - 11:37

Personnel
Tim Berne - alto saxophone, voice
Herb Robertson - trumpet, cornet, laryngeal crowbar
Mark Feldman - violin, baritone violin
Hank Roberts - cello, electric cello, vocals
Mark Dresser - bass, giffus, bungy
Joey Baron - drums, CZ-101, shacktronics

References 

1989 albums
Tim Berne albums
JMT Records albums
Winter & Winter Records albums